Zamarada baliata is a moth of the family Geometridae first described by Felder in 1874. It is found in Sundaland and most likely in India and Sri Lanka.

A reddish colour is confined to the outer parts and interior to the fine pale submarginal. The host plant of the caterpillar is Cassia fistula.

References

External links
A new species of the genus Zamarada Moore (Lepidoptera: Geometridae) from Shivaliks in Punjab, India

Moths of Asia
Moths described in 1974